Jilantagaan is a small island to the east of Bantayan Island in the Philippines.  The entire island forms a single barangay (Hilantagaan) of Santa Fe.

References

Barangays of Cebu